Canebora (foaled in 1960 in Ontario) is a Thoroughbred racehorse who won the Canadian Triple Crown in 1963 and was voted the Sovereign Award for Horse of the Year.

References
 Canebora's pedigree and racing stats

1960 racehorse births
Racehorses bred in Ontario
Racehorses trained in Canada
King's Plate winners
Canadian Thoroughbred Horse of the Year
Triple Crown of Thoroughbred Racing winners
Thoroughbred family 12